This page list topics related to Comoros.



0-9
 2015 in the Comoros

A
Ahmed Abdallah
Ahmed Abdallah Mohamed Sambi
Ali Soilih
Azali Assoumani
Kassim Ahamada

B
Ahmed Ben Said Djaffar

C
Caabi El-Yachroutu Mohamed
Cannabis in Comoros
Combo Ayouba
Communications in Comoros
Comoro Islands
Comoros passport sales scandal

D
Demographics of Comoros
Bob Denard

E
Economy of Comoros

F
Flag of the Comoros
Foreign relations of Comoros

G
Geography of Comoros

H
Hamada Madi
History of Comoros

I
Ikililou Dhoinine
Islam in Comoros

J

K

L
LGBT rights in Comoros (Gay rights)
List of Comorians

M

 Mohamed Ahmed
 Mohamed Taki Abdoulkarim
 Moustadroine Abdou

N

O

P
Politics of Comoros

Q

R

S

 Said Ali Kemal
 Said Atthoumani
 Said Mohamed Djohar
 Said Mohamed Jaffar

T
Tadjidine Ben Said Massounde
Transportation in Comoros

U

V

W
Wezombeli

X

Y
Nakim Youssoufa

Z

Lists
Heads of state of Comoros
List of current Comorian islands presidents
List of Notable Comorians -

See also
Lists of country-related topics - similar lists for other countries

 
Comoros